Landscape is the first album by the band Landscape, released in 1979. It contains ten instrumental tracks with a jazz-funk influence.

The album was reissued in 1992 on the Mau Mau Records label. This CD also includes Landscape's second album From the Tea-rooms of Mars ..... The album was reissued again in November 2009 on the Cherry Pop label. This CD also includes Landscape's final album, Manhattan Boogie-Woogie.

Track listing

LP: RCA PL 25248

1992 Mau Mau Records CD: MAU CD 618

2009 Cherry Pop CD: CR POP 36

Personnel
Landscape
Richard James Burgess - Pearl Drums, SDS 3 drums synthesizer, acoustic percussion, Moog drum
Christopher Heaton - Yamaha CS80 polyphonic synthesizer, Fender Rhodes Piano, grand piano, Roland Chorus Echo
Andy Pask – fretless and fretted Griffin basses
Peter Thoms - trombone, electric trombone
John Walters - soprano saxophone, Lyricon, flute

Production
Producer: Greg Walsh
Engineer: Greg Walsh
Additional engineering: Peter Walsh, Richard Manwaring
Assistant engineers: Marlis Duncklau, Simon Hurrell
Graphics: John Warwicker
J.J. Jeczalik, Peter Lorimer - continuity supervision

Audio excerpts

References

1979 debut albums
Landscape (band) albums
RCA Records albums